Ṣil-Bel (Philistine: 𐤑𐤋𐤁𐤏𐤋* *Ṣīlbaʿl, probably "(in the) shadow/protection of Baal", cf. Bezalel;  ṣil-bēl) or Ṣilli-Bel was a Philistine king of Gaza during the 7th century BCE. He is mentioned in the annals of Ashurbanipal and Esarhaddon as one of many kings under Neo-Assyrian suzerainty. During the reign of Sennacherib, Hezekiah of Judah revolted against Assyrian rule, and was ultimately defeated. According to Sennacherib's Annals, Sil-Bel, along with his fellow Philistine kings, Mitinti of Ashdod and Padi of Ekron, were given several fortified Judean cities that Sennacherib had conquered during his campaign.

References

Philistine kings
Philistines
7th-century BC rulers
History of Gaza City